Miroslav (Cyrillic script: Мирослав) (also see: Polish Mirosław) is a Slavic masculine name meaning 'one who celebrates peace, one who celebrates the world'.

Notable people
 Miroslav (kaznac), Serbian nobleman
 Miroslav of Croatia, medieval king of Croatia
 Miroslav of Hum, Serbian king of Zahumlje
 Miroslav of Podgoria, Serbian Zupan of Podgorica
 Miroslav Barnyashev, Bulgarian professional wrestler better known as Miro
 Miroslav Blažević, Croatian football coach
 Miroslav Cerar, Slovene gymnast and Olympian
 Miroslav Ilić, Serbian singer-songwriter
 Miroslav Janů, Czech football manager
 Miroslav Karhan, Slovak footballer
 Miroslav Klose, German footballer
 Miroslav Kostadinov, Bulgarian singer
 Miroslav Krleža, Croatian writer
 Miroslav Kultyshev, Russian pianist
 Miroslav Navratil, Croatian military commander
 Miroslav Nikolić, Serbian basketball coach
 Miroslav Radović, Serbian footballer
 Miroslav Raduljica, Serbian basketball player
 Miroslav Šatan, Slovak professional ice hockey player
 Miroslav Škoro, Croatian musician
 Miroslav Stevanović (born 1990), Bosnian footballer
 Miroslav Stević, Serbian footballer
 Miroslav Stoch, Slovak footballer
 Miroslav Tichý, Czech photographer
 Miroslav Tuđman, Croatian politician
 Miroslav Vulićević, Serbian footballer
 Miroslav Wanek, Czech poet and composer

See also
 Mirosław (given name)

External links
 Behindthename.com

Slavic masculine given names
Bosnian masculine given names
Bulgarian masculine given names
Croatian masculine given names
Czech masculine given names
Macedonian masculine given names
Montenegrin masculine given names
Slovak masculine given names
Slovene masculine given names
Serbian masculine given names
Ukrainian masculine given names